Sunwing Travel Group is a privately-owned travel company headquartered in Toronto, Canada.  The group operates an airline, three tour operators, a retail chain, a vacation club and destination management company.

History 
Sunwing Travel Group was founded in 2002 by Colin Hunter. By 2004, Sunwing had become the second largest tour operator in Ontario.  On November 17, 2005, Sunwing Airlines' inaugural flight, a Boeing 737-800, departed from Toronto Pearson airport.

In 2009, Sunwing Travel Group announced that it was acquiring the tour operator Signature Vacations and its SellOffVacations.com retail division from the UK-based TUI Travel. As part of the acquisition TUI gained 49 percent ownership of Sunwing Travel Group and Stephen Hunter replaced his father as CEO of the company. Sunwing Travel Group acquired Caribbean NexusTours, a tour operator in the Dominican Republic and Mexico, in 2010. The company was renamed NexusTours and remains a separate company within Sunwing Travel Group. In 2011, Sunwing Travel Group announced that it would enter the European market with a seasonal service from Canada to Europe. On December 9, 2011, Sunwing Travel Group acquired the Atlanta-based tour operator Vacation Express for an undisclosed sum. The acquisition was the group's entrance to the US market.

In 2015, Sunwing Travel Group announced that affiliate, Blue Diamond Resorts, would open a 600-room resort in Jamaica. Later that year, the company began construction on $400 million resort in Antigua with 500 rooms.

Subsidiaries

Controversies 
In June, 2012, an unnamed individual and Transat A.T. submitted information to the Canadian Transportation Agency that was believed to challenge Sunwing's ability to operate an airline on the grounds of foreign ownership.  In November 2012, the CTA announced that Sunwing operated within foreign ownership limits.

In December 2016 a pilot was removed from the cockpit of a Sunwing flight and charged after it was determined that he was drunk. A police spokesman indicated that it was Sunwing staff that determined the pilot was impaired and implied that his license would be revoked.

References 

Privately held companies of Canada
Canadian companies established in 2002
Holding companies established in 2002
Transport companies established in 2002
Airline holding companies of Canada
Travel and holiday companies of Canada
Companies based in Etobicoke
2002 establishments in Ontario